The 1916 United States presidential election in Indiana took place on November 7, 1916, as part of the 1916 United States presidential election which was held throughout all contemporary 48 states. Voters chose 15 representatives, or electors to the Electoral College, who voted for president and vice president. 

Indiana was won by the Republican nominee, U.S. Supreme Court Justice Charles Evans Hughes of New York, and his running mate Senator Charles W. Fairbanks of Indiana. Hughes and Fairbanks defeated the Democratic nominees, incumbent Democratic President Woodrow Wilson and Vice President Thomas R. Marshall. 

This was the home state of Vice President Thomas R. Marshall, and along with Wilson's loss in New Jersey, this election, along with 1968, is the only time a winning presidential and vice presidential candidate lost both of their home states. 

Hughes won the state by a narrow margin of 0.97%. This is the first time since 1876 that Indiana voted for the losing candidate, and the first time since 1836 that a Democrat won without the state. The election marked the beginning of a trend in which the state was more Republican than the nation as a whole. Before 1916, all but one winning Democrat as well as one losing Democrat had carried the state. Beginning with 1916, the Democratic party has won 14 elections as of 2022, and in only four of these elections did it carry Indiana. Furthermore, three of those four victories were in landslide elections with double-digit margins: 1932, 1936, and 1964.

Results

See also
 United States presidential elections in Indiana

References

Indiana
1916
1916 Indiana elections